A list of Kannada language films produced in the Kannada film industry in India in the year 2019.
 Films are generally released every Friday or Festival Day
 In addition films can be released on specific festival days.

January–June

July–December

References

External links 
 Kannada Upcoming Releases at Filmibeat.com

Lists of 2019 films by country or language
2019
2019 in Indian cinema